Ivana Nešović ( born 23 July 1988) is a  volleyball player from Serbia, playing as an opposite for South Korean club Gyeongbuk Gimcheon Hi-pass and the Serbia women's national volleyball team.

Career 
Her professional career started in 2003 in Red Star, and in the same season the club won the national championship. During her stay in Red Star for three years she was a captain and was named as the most talented young player. Nešović was a member of the Red Star until 2010, when after a successful season she signed a contract with Italian club Asystel Novara.

In the 2010/11 season she played for Asystel, and played the next season for Soverato from Southern Italy. After the half-season in South Korean club Seongnam KEC Hi-pass, Nešović signed a contract with Japanese team Denso Airybees.

On 19 September 2012, Denso Airybees announced her joining.

On January 15 2015, Nešović signed with Olympiacos.

Trophies 
 National Championship of Serbia and Montenegro (2003/2004)
 National Championship of Serbia (2009/2010)
 Serbia Cup (2010)
 Greek Women's Volleyball Cup (2015)

Individual awards 

 2008 - Best player of National Championship in October
 2012 - Best player in South Korea in February

References

1988 births
Living people
Serbian women's volleyball players
Olympiacos Women's Volleyball players
Sportspeople from Belgrade
Serbian expatriate sportspeople in Italy
Serbian expatriate sportspeople in South Korea
Serbian expatriate sportspeople in Japan
Serbian expatriate sportspeople in China
Serbian expatriate sportspeople in Greece
Serbian expatriate sportspeople in Turkey